The women's team event at the 2010 South American Games included the technical routine on March 26, at 22:15, and the free routine on March 29, at 20:10.

Medalists

Results

Technical routine

Free routine

Summary

References
Technical Routine
Free Routine
Summary

Swimming at the 2010 South American Games